Lophopanilla is a monotypic moth genus of the family Erebidae erected by George Hampson in 1926. Its only species, Lophopanilla obscurissima, was first described by William Jacob Holland in 1894. It is found in Gabon.

References

Calpinae
Monotypic moth genera